Frederick Rounsville "Fritz" Payne Jr. (July 31, 1911 – August 6, 2015) was a World War II Ace and a brigadier general in the United States Marine Corps. Payne was awarded the Navy Cross for service with VMF-212.

Education
He attended the United States Naval Academy from 1930 to 1932 and subsequently graduated from the University of Arizona in 1935.

Career
Payne was awarded the Navy Cross for service with VMF-212 on Guadalcanal between September and October 1942, shooting down six Japanese airplanes. After the war, he continued his service with U.S. Marines and fought in the Korean war until he retired from U.S. Marines in 1958. In his post-military career, Payne helped plan the construction of the San Onofre Nuclear Generating Station, He retired from Southern California Edison in 1976. He was also honored with the Congressional Gold Medal in May 2015. Payne died six days after his 104th birthday on August 6, 2015, at Rancho Mirage, California; at the time of his death he was the oldest living former fighter ace.

Awards

 Congressional Gold Medal (2015)
 Navy Cross

Personal
He came from a military family: his father served in the Spanish–American War after graduating from the United States Naval Academy and World War I. He was raised in Indianapolis, Indiana and he also attended the Naval Academy. He enlisted in the Marine Corps and became a pilot. He was married to Dorothy and had two children: Son, Dewitt, and daughter, Ann Wilson Payne.

See also
 List of World War II aces from the United States
 List of World War II flying aces

References

Further reading

1911 births
2015 deaths
American centenarians
American World War II flying aces
Men centenarians
People from Elmira, New York
Recipients of the Navy Cross (United States)
United States Marine Corps generals
United States Marine Corps pilots of World War II
United States Naval Academy alumni
United States Navy pilots of World War II